Wayne Ferreira was the defending champion, but lost in the second round to Richey Reneberg.

Thomas Enqvist won the title by defeating Bernd Karbacher 6–4, 6–3 in the final.

Seeds
The first eight seeds received a bye to the second round.

Draw

Finals

Top half

Section 1

Section 2

Bottom half

Section 3

Section 4

References

External links
 Official results archive (ATP)
 Official results archive (ITF)

Atlanta Open (tennis)
1995 ATP Tour